Joel Bailey may refer to:

 Joel John Bailey (born 1980), soccer player
Joel Bailey (surveyor) (1732–1797), American surveyor
 Joel Bailey (tennis) (born 1951), American tennis player
 Joel Bailey (musician), former bassist of Sixpence None the Richer